San Giorgio Bigarello, until 2018 as San Giorgio di Mantova is a comune (municipality) in the Province of Mantua in the Italian region Lombardy, located about  east of Milan and about  east of Mantua.

The municipality of San Giorgio di Mantova contains the frazioni of  Caselle, Ghisiolo, Mottella (which is the municipality seat), Tripoli, Villanova De Bellis, and Villanova Maiardina. The commune's name refers to an older borough which, during the Napoleonic Wars, was destroyed to make room to fortifications defending Mantua.

See also
Lovers of Valdaro

References

External links
 Official website

Cities and towns in Lombardy